François de Cossé-Brissac, 13th Duke of Brissac (19 February 1929 – 6 April 2021), was a French aristocrat. He held the noble title Duke of Brissac from 1993 until his death in 2021.

Biography
François was the son of Pierre de Cossé Brissac, 12th Duke of Brissac, and his wife, Marie Zélie Antoinette Eugénie Schneider, who was the daughter of industrialist Eugène Schneider II. In 1958, he married Jacqueline Alice Marie de Contades, with whom he had five children: Agnès Alexandra Marie Bienvenue, Charles-André Raymond Timoléon Aymard Hubert Marie, Angélique Patricia Marie, Marie-Antoinette Elvire, and Pierre-Emmanuel Timoléon Marie Raymond.

De Cossé-Brissac served as President of the Jockey-Club de Paris from 1997 to 2014 and was Grand Master of the Order of Saint Lazarus from 1986 to 2004. He was the proprietor of the Château de Brissac in Brissac-Quincé.

Bibliography
Les Brissac (1952)
Les Brissac et l'histoire (1973)
L'histoire de la maison Cossé-Brissac (1987)

References

Further reading

1929 births
2021 deaths
Dukes of Brissac
Grand Masters of the Order of Saint Lazarus (statuted 1910)
People from Le Creusot